João Batista da Silva (born 18 December 1966 in Brazil) is a Brazilian retired footballer.

Career

For the 1997 season, despite being hesitant at first, Batista signed for American top flight side Tampa Bay Mutiny after the brother of another Brazilian player who knew his friends thought he would be an ideal fit for the league. After that, Batista took the 1998 season off due to injury before playing in the Brazilian lower leagues with São José Esporte Clube, Esporte Clube Noroeste, Rio Preto Esporte Clube, Clube Atlético Sorocaba], and Associação Atlética Anapolina.

References

External links
 João Batista at playmakerstats.com (English version of ogol.com.br)

Brazilian footballers
Living people
Association football midfielders
1966 births
Tampa Bay Mutiny players
Major League Soccer players